1927 in philosophy

Events 
 Henri Bergson was awarded the 1927 Nobel Prize in Literature "in recognition of his rich and vitalizing ideas and the brilliant skill with which they have been presented".

Publications 
 Bertrand Russell, Why I Am Not a Christian (1927)
 George Sarton, Introduction to the History of Science (1927-1948)
 Carl Schmitt, The Concept of the Political (1927)
 Martin Heidegger, Being and Time (1927)

Births 
 February 24 - Ernst Sieber, Swiss pastor (died 2018)
 May 5 - Robert Spaemann, German Catholic philosopher (died 2018)
 May 7 - Joseph Agassi, Israeli philosopher (died 2023)
 September 4 - John McCarthy, American pioneer of Artificial Intelligence (died 2011)
 September 23 - Klaus Heinrich, German philosopher of religion (died 2020)
 October 23 - Leszek Kołakowski, Polish philosopher (died 2009) 
 October 31 - Edmund Gettier, American philosopher (died 2020)
 December 20 - David Markson, American experimental novelist (died 2010)

Deaths 
 March 31 - Kang Youwei (born 1858)

References 

Philosophy
20th-century philosophy
Philosophy by year